Mauro Gattinoni (born 22 July 1977 in Lecco) is an Italian politician.

He ran for Mayor of Lecco as an independent at the 2020 Italian local elections, supported by a centre-left coalition. He was elected at the second round with 50.07% and took office on 6 October 2020.

See also
2020 Italian local elections
List of mayors of Lecco

References

External links
 

1977 births
Living people
Mayors of Lecco
People from Lecco